National Novel Writing Month (often shortened to NaNoWriMo ) is a U.S.-based nonprofit organization that promotes creative writing around the world. Its flagship program is an annual, international creative writing event in which participants attempt to write a 50,000-word manuscript during the month of November. Well-known authors write "pep-talks" in order to motivate participants during the month. The website provides participants, called "Wrimos", with tips for writer's block, information on where local participants are meeting, and an online community of support. Focusing on the length of a work rather than the quality, writers are encouraged to finish their first draft quickly so it can be edited later at their discretion. The project started in July 1999 with 21 participants. In 2019, 455,080 participated in the organization's programs.

Writers wishing to participate first register on the project's website, where they can post profiles and information about their novels, including synopses and excerpts. Regional volunteers called "Municipal Liaisons" help connect local writers, hold in-person and virtual writing events, and provide encouragement.

History 
Freelance writer Chris Baty started the project in July 1999 with 21 participants in the San Francisco Bay area. In 2000, it was moved to November "to more fully take advantage of the miserable weather." and launched an official website, designed by a friend of Baty's. That year 140 participants signed up for the event, including several from other countries. Baty launched a Yahoo! group to facilitate socialization between participants and, after the posters began asking about guidelines, he set most of the event's basic ground rules: the novel must be new, cannot be co-authored, and must be submitted in time to be verified. Of the 140 participants, 29 completed the challenge as manually verified by Baty himself.

The following year, Baty expected similar numbers, but 5,000 participants registered, which he credits to news of the event being spread by bloggers and later being reported on by various news organizations including the Los Angeles Times and Washington Post. Though Baty was happy with the large turnout and popularity of the event, it almost did not happen, as the website had a number of problems leading to participants being asked to post themselves as winners on an honor system; in the end, 700 people would do so.

2002 saw technical improvements and increased automation to the site, and media attention from National Public Radio and CBS Evening News drew increased attention and a participant count of 14,000. The next year, the NaNoWriMo team began the Municipal Liaison program where volunteers could act as moderators in the forums as well as send out the first set of pep talk emails. Municipal Liaisons also acted as leaders for a specific region under their jurisdiction - organizing fundraisers and calling meetings for NaNoWriMo participants residing in their region. Baty also began work on his debut novel "No Plot? No Problem!" during the 2003 NaNoWriMo, writing the NaNoWriMo guide concurrent with his own novel.

In 2005, NaNoWriMo was registered as a nonprofit organization due to the event growing strongly every year, which became the Office of Letters and Light.

In 2011, the NaNoWriMo website was given a new layout and forums. Baty announced that he would be stepping down as executive director in January 2012 to pursue a full-time writing career. Grant Faulkner took his position as executive director. The redesigned website moved from being based on Drupal to Ruby-on-Rails. During the first month after launch, the new website supported over 1,000,000 visitors and more than 39,000,000 pageviews.

By 2015, 431,626 people participated (633 different regions) in NaNoWriMo. Of those participants, more than 40,000 won.

Rules 
Since NaNoWriMo is used to get people writing, the rules are kept broad and straightforward:
 Writing starts at 12:00: a.m. on November 1 and ends 11:59:59 p.m. on November 30, local time.
 No one is allowed to start early and the challenge finishes exactly 30 days from that start point.
 Novels must reach a minimum of 50,000 words before the end of November in order to win. These words can either be a complete novel of 50,000 words or the first 50,000 words of a novel to be completed later.
 Planning and extensive notes are permitted, but no material written before the November 1 start date can go into the body of the novel.
 Participants' novels can be on any theme, genre of fiction, and language. Everything from fanfiction, which uses trademarked characters, to novels in poem format, and metafiction is allowed; according to the website's FAQ, "If you believe you're writing a novel, we believe you're writing a novel too."

"Rebelling" is allowed, as NaNoWriMo is considered a "self-challenge"; rebels are allowed to validate and thus receive any prizes from sponsors.

Winning and prizes 
To win NaNoWriMo, participants must write an average of approximately 1,667 words per day (69 per hour, 1.2 per minute) in November to reach the goal of 50,000 words written toward a novel. Organizers of the event say that the aim is to get people to start writing, using the deadline as an incentive to get the story going and to put words to paper. There is no fee to participate in NaNoWriMo; registration is only required for novel verification.

No official prizes are awarded for length, quality, or speed, though self-awarded badges are available on the site. Anyone who reaches the 50,000-word mark is declared a winner. Beginning November 20, participants can submit their novel to be automatically verified for length and receive a printable certificate, an icon they can display on the web, and inclusion on the list of winners. No precautions are taken to prevent cheating; since the reward for winning is the finished novel itself and the satisfaction of having written it, there is little incentive to cheat. Novels are verified for word count by software, and may be scrambled or otherwise encrypted before being submitted for verification, although the software does not keep any other record of text input. It is possible to win without anyone other than the author ever seeing or reading the novel.

In October 2007, the self-publishing company CreateSpace teamed up with NaNoWriMo to begin offering winners a single free, paperback proof copy of their manuscripts, with the option to use the proof to then sell the novel on Amazon.com. In 2011, CreateSpace offered winners five free, paperback proof copies of their manuscripts. In addition to CreateSpace, each year NaNoWriMo has a new list of sponsors that reward winners and participants with various discounts and prizes.

Community

Forums 
The official forums provide a place for advice, information, criticism, support, and an opportunity for "collective procrastination." The forums are available from the beginning of October, when signups for the year begin, until late September the following year, when they are archived and the database is wiped in preparation for that year's NaNoWriMo forums to start up again.

Most regions have one or more Municipal Liaisons (ML) assigned to them, who are volunteers that help with organizing local events and mediate regional forums. MLs are encouraged to coordinate at least two kinds of meet-ups; a kickoff party, and a "Thank God It's Over" party to celebrate successes and share novels. Kickoff parties are often held the weekend before November to give local writers a chance to meet and get geared up, although some are held on Halloween night past midnight so writers start writing in a community setting. Other events may be scheduled, including weekend meet-ups or overnight write-ins.

The Night of Writing Dangerously 
In November 2007, NaNoWriMo hosted a fundraising Write-a-thon event called 'The Night of Writing Dangerously', held in San Francisco. The first 250 participants to donate at least $200 to the NaNoWriMo website received reservations at this annual event, at which participants met the organization's staff, listened to speeches, chatted, ate, participated in raffles, and competed to see who could write the most at the event. In 2015, this fundraiser raised over $56,000. By 2016, the required donation amount to attend the event had risen to $300. 2018 was the last year in which the event was held, as the cost to put on the event rose and the funds raised by the event decreased.

Programs

Laptop Loaners 
Starting in 2002, NaNoWriMo ran a Laptop Loaner program for those without regular access to a computer or word processor. Functional used laptops were donated by NaNoWriMo participants, and borrowers were required to send a $300 deposit with proof of identity and cover the cost of return shipping.

In 2008, AlphaSmart, Inc. donated 25 Neo word processors.

In 2009 the Laptop Loaner program ended before that year's NaNoWriMo event.

Young Writers Program 
In 2004, NaNoWriMo started the Young Writers Program (YWP),  a writing workshop aimed to aid classrooms of kindergarten through 12th-grade students. The difference between the regular program and the YWP was that kids could choose how many words to try to write. The word count goal for a young writer can range from a few thousand words, to the adult-standard 50,000, and even higher in some cases; a typical standard is around 30,000.  In its inaugural year, the program was used in 150 classrooms and involved 4000 students. Teachers register their classroom for participation and are sent a starter kit of materials to use in the class which includes reward items like stickers and pencils. Lesson plans and writing ideas are also offered as resources to teachers, while students can communicate through the program's forums. The only age restriction on the YWP is that, in most circumstances, no one can be over 18. When a user turns 18, they are sent to the main site; however, high school seniors who turn 18 during their senior year can remain in the program until graduation. YWP has their own forums which anyone from 13-17 can be on.

The Office of Letters and Light 
In September 2006, NaNoWriMo officially became a 501(c)(3) non-profit organization operating under the name "The Office of Letters and Light."

In 2004, NaNoWriMo partnered with child literacy non-profit Room to Read, and continued that partnership for three years. Fifty percent of net proceeds from 2004 to 2006 were used to build libraries in Southeast Asia; three were built in Cambodia, seven in Laos, and seven in Vietnam. The program was retired in 2007 to refocus resources on NaNoWriMo and the Young Writers Program.

Camp NaNoWriMo 
A summer version of NaNoWriMo, called Camp NaNoWriMo, launched in 2011. Two sessions were held, one in July and one in August; however, the months were switched to June and August for Camp NaNoWriMo 2012. The two months were then switched to April and July for 2013 and 2014, and have stayed the same since. The rules used for the main event in November also applied to each Camp NaNoWriMo session.

There used to be a Camp NaNoWriMo website, but it was merged into the main NaNoWriMo site. The cabins were now made by making groups on the site., each with its own message board visible only by members of that cabin. Camp NaNoWriMo participants may choose their word count goal, similar to the Young Writers Program.

The "Now What?" Months 
In 2013, January and February were deemed NaNoWriMo's "Now What?" Months, designed to help novelists during the editing and revision process. To participate, writers commit to revisit their novels, signing a contract via NaNoWriMo, then attend Internet seminars where publishing experts and NaNoWriMo novelists are available to advise writers on the next steps for their draft. After that, participants communicate on Twitter to compare editing notes and interact with agents and publishers. Participants stay updated with NaNoWriMo's blog where encouragement and advice are offered by authors, editors, and agents.

Published NaNoWriMo novels 

Since 2006, nearly 400 NaNoWriMo novels have been published via traditional publishing houses and over 200 novels have been published by smaller presses or self-published.

Some notable titles include:
 Water for Elephants by Sara Gruen, published by Algonquin Books of Chapel Hill
 Persistence of Memory by Amelia Atwater-Rhodes, published by Delacorte Press
 Anna and the French Kiss by Stephanie Perkins, published by Dutton Juvenile
 The Night Circus by Erin Morgenstern, published by Doubleday
 Wool by Hugh Howey, published by Simon & Schuster
 Cinder by Marissa Meyer, published by Square Fish
 Fangirl by Rainbow Rowell, published by St. Martin's Press
 The Darwin Elevator by Jason M. Hough, published by Del Rey Books
 Side Effects May Vary by Julie Murphy, published by HarperCollins Publishers
 Assassin's Heart by Sarah Ahiers, published by HarperCollins Publishers
 The Forest of Hands and Teeth by Carrie Ryan, published by Gollancz
 The Cut Out by Jack Heath, published by Allen & Unwin
 The Beautiful Land, by Alan Averill, published by Ace Books
 The Wedding Date, by Jasmine Guillory, published by Berkley (Penguin Books)

Spin-off events 
 Script Frenzy: creating a script in April of every year that ran from 2007-2012.
 Southern Cross Novel Challenge: southern hemisphere version of event that ran in June from 2007-2013.

See also
Lune Spark Young Writers' Short Story Contest
National Kids-in-Print Book Contest for Students
PBS Kids Writers Contest
Three-Day Novel Contest

References

External links 

Camp NaNoWriMo Site
(2007) Three-Part, In-Depth Interview with founder Chris Baty at Writer Unboxed
(2012) Interview with Chris Baty at Terrible Minds
Analysis tools for NaNoWriMo text

1999 establishments in the United States
501(c)(3) organizations
Month-long observances
November observances
Recurring events established in 1999
Writing contests